Neptunium fluoride may refer to:

Neptunium(III) fluoride, NpF3
Neptunium(IV) fluoride, NpF4
Neptunium(V) fluoride, NpF5
Neptunium(VI) fluoride, NpF6